The 2016 NCAA Division I Wrestling Championships took place from March 17 to March 19 in New York City, New York at the Madison Square Garden. The tournament was the 86th NCAA Division I Wrestling Championships, and featured seventy two teams across that level.

Penn State won their sixth title after their streak of four titles was broken by Ohio State in 2015. PSU's head coach Cael Sanderson was named NCAA Coach of the Year.

Team results

 Note: Top 10 only
 (H): Team from hosting U.S. state

Individual results
 Note: Table does not include wrestlebacks
 (H): Individual from hosting U.S. State
Source:

References

2016 in American sports
2016 in sport wrestling
2016 in sports in New York City
March 2016 sports events in the United States
Sports in New York (state)